Don Francesco, Principe Ruspoli (born 31 March 1967) is an Italian banker who is the 10th Principe di Cerveteri, 10th Marchese di Riano, 15th Conte di Vignanello and Prince of the Roman Papal State. He is the son of Alessandro Ruspoli, 9th Prince of Cerveteri, and French aristocrat Nancy de Girard de Charbonnières.

Life and career 
Ruspoli studied at a boarding school in the United Kingdom. He then served in the Italian Army for a year before attending John Cabot University in Rome. Ruspoli had worked in banking for over 25 years between Rome, Paris, and London, and he currently works for Banca Generali.

Trustee of the John Cabot University Board of Trustees since September 2022. President of the Alumni Association and Executive committee member for Facilities, Development and Budget & Finance.  

Honorary Committee member of the Centro Studi Santa Giacinta Marescotti for the Premio Francesco Maria Ruspoli for baroque music, founded by Giada Ruspoli. 

He is Vice-President of the Mascarade Opera Foundation, and a member of the Honorary Committee of the New Generation Festival. He was appointed as Grand Chancellor of the Sacred Military Constantinian Order of Saint George on 14 May 2016.

Marriage and children 
On 20 September 2014 in Ozzano Monferrato, he married Angelica Visconti. She is the daughter of Giuseppe Visconti and Fulvia Ferragamo, a daughter of the famous shoe designer Salvatore Ferragamo.

They have a son and a daughter:
 Don Alessandro dei Principi Ruspoli (Milan, 29 Nov 2014)
 Donna Vittoria dei Principi Ruspoli (Milan, 23 May 2016)

Honours 
 Knight Grand Cross of Justice – Sacred Military Constantinian Order of Saint George (14 May 2016)

References

External links 
 Francesco Ruspoli a genealogical site

1967 births
Living people
Francesco
Italian nobility
Francesco
Nobles of the Holy See